First Love is a 2018 Philippine drama-romance film written and directed by Paul Soriano starring Aga Muhlach and Bea Alonzo. It was filmed in Vancouver, Canada and released in the Philippines on October 17, 2018. The film was produced by Ten17P in participation with Star Cinema and Viva Films.

Plot
Ali (Bea Alonzo) is an impulsive photographer who savors every moment of her life. Nick (Aga Muhlach), is a venture capitalist,  who accidentally meets Ali in a bookshop where Ali works. The two strangers bump into each other underneath the shop’s doorway and, in slo-mo fashion, they connect on a deep, romantic level that doesn’t quite reach you.

Ali’s infectious charm is too strong for Nick to resist though. She is full of life and lives each day like it’s her last, quite literally because Ali has a grave heart condition. Soon, their chance encounter turns into something deeper, something worth risking heartbreak for.

Cast

References

External links

2018 films
Viva Films films
Star Cinema drama films
Star Cinema films
Films directed by Paul Soriano